Hotel Malibu is an American drama television series that aired on CBS from August 4 to September 8, 1994 and  was created and written by producers Bernard Lechowick and Lynn Marie Latham.  Its cast includes Jennifer Lopez, Joanna Cassidy, Harry Reilly, and John Dye. The pilot episode was directed by Sharron Miller. It was a spin-off of the show Second Chances.

Premise
The series centered on the Mayfield family who ran the Hotel Malibu in California.

Cast
Joanna Cassidy as Eleanor Mayfield
Cheryl Pollak as Stephanie Mayfield
John Dye as Jack Mayfield
Harry O'Reilly as Harry Radzimski
Romy Walthall as Nancy Radzimski Salvucci
Jennifer Lopez as Melinda Lopez
Pepe Serna as Salvatore Lopez

Episodes

References

External links

1990s American drama television series
1994 American television series debuts
1994 American television series endings
English-language television shows
CBS original programming
American television spin-offs
Television shows set in Malibu, California
Fictional hotels